Thrypticomyia is a genus of crane fly in the family Limoniidae.

Species
T. aclistia (Alexander, 1967)
T. apicalis (Wiedemann, 1828)
T. arachnophila (Alexander, 1927)
T. arcus (Alexander, 1964)
T. aureipennis Skuse, 1890
T. basitarsatra (Alexander, 1948)
T. bigeminata (Alexander, 1961)
T. brevicuspis (Alexander, 1929)
T. carissa (Alexander, 1948)
T. carolinensis (Alexander, 1940)
T. decussata (Alexander, 1972)
T. dichaeta (Alexander, 1948)
T. dichromogaster Edwards, 1927
T. doddi (Alexander, 1921)
T. estigmata (Alexander, 1967)
T. fumidapicalis (Alexander, 1921)
T. gizoensis (Alexander, 1978)
T. marksae (Alexander, 1956)
T. microstigma (Alexander, 1921)
T. monocera (Alexander, 1927)
T. multiseta (Alexander, 1961)
T. nigeriensis (Alexander, 1921)
T. niveitibia (Alexander, 1957)
T. octosetosa (Alexander, 1931)
T. ponapicola (Alexander, 1972)
T. seychellensis Edwards, 1912
T. sparsiseta (Alexander, 1947)
T. spathulata (Alexander, 1936)
T. spathulifera (Alexander, 1936)
T. subsaltens (Alexander, 1924)
T. tetrachaeta (Alexander, 1972)
T. tinianensis (Alexander, 1972)
T. trifusca (Alexander, 1948)
T. unisetosa (Alexander, 1929)
T. zimmermaniana (Alexander, 1947)

References

Limoniidae